Tishomingo was chief of the Chickasaw nation.

Tishomingo may also refer to:

Places

United States

Mississippi 
 Tishomingo, Mississippi
 Tishomingo County, Mississippi
 Tishomingo Creek, a stream in Mississippi from which a battle on June 10, 1864, took its name
 Tishomingo State Park

Oklahoma 
 Tishomingo, Oklahoma
 Tishomingo National Wildlife Refuge

Buildings 
 Tishomingo City Hall
 Tishomingo Hotel

Arts, entertainment and media 
 Tishomingo Blues, a 1917 song by Spencer Williams
 Tishomingo Blues, a 2002 novel by Elmore Leonard

See also 
 
 Tishomingo County School District, a public school district based in Iuka, Mississippi